Steve Twellman (born December 14, 1949) was a U.S. soccer player who spent three seasons in the North American Soccer League.

Twellman attended Michigan State University where he played on the Spartans soccer team during its first years playing in the NCAA Division I.  He was team captain in 1971, earning second team All American recognition that season.

In 1972, the Atlanta Chiefs selected Twellman in the first round of the North American Soccer League college draft.  He spent two seasons in Atlanta.  In 1973, the team was renamed the Atlanta Apollos when ownership changed.  The team folded at the end of the season and Twellman moved to the Boston Minutemen for the 1974 season.

References

External links
 NASL stats

1949 births
American soccer players
Michigan State Spartans men's soccer players
North American Soccer League (1968–1984) players
Atlanta Chiefs players
Boston Minutemen players
Living people
Association football fullbacks